PeoplePerHour, legally People Per Hour Limited, is a UK-based company whose function is as an online platform giving businesses access to freelance workers.

History 
Founded in 2007 by Xenios Thrasyvoulou and Simos Kitiris, the company has offices in London and Athens.  Businesses opting to use the website are often start-ups or SMEs looking to grow flexibly by hiring freelancers to handle projects rather than hiring in-house or via agencies. 
 
There is some debate as to whether the emergence of this type of freelance marketplace is part of a longer-term structural change in the way that companies across the world manage their human resources.

Reception  
In August 2012, PeoplePerHour was named by the science and technology magazine, Wired UK as one of "Europe's 100 Hottest Startups of 2012".

In 2012 its 50-person engineering department relocated to Athens.
One of the major investors in PeoplePerHour's is Index Ventures, which gave the company £2M (3.2M dollars) in 2012. Mike Volpi has named PeoplePerHour among the three "most underrated companies" in the Index's portfolio. In its previous seed round, the company had raised approximately £425k.

See also 
 Guru.com
 Freelancer.com
 
 Fiverr
 Upwork

References

External links 
 

Employment websites
Freelance marketplace websites
Service companies of England
Internet properties established in 2007
British companies established in 2007